Oliva keenii is a species of sea snail, a marine gastropod mollusk in the family Olividae, the olives.

References

keenii
Gastropods described in 1870